was a town located in Senboku District, Akita Prefecture, Japan.

In 2003, the town had an estimated population of 12,471 and a density of 18.56 persons per km². The total area was 672.06 km².

On September 20, 2005, Tazawako, along with the town of Kakunodate, and the village of Nishiki (all from Senboku District), was merged to create the city of Semboku.

Eponymous Lake Tazawa is the deepest lake in Japan at 423 meters. The town has several popular onsen.

The area is served by Tazawako Station, which is served by the Akita Shinkansen and the Tazawako Line.

External links
 Official Website (English)
 Official Website (Japanese)

Dissolved municipalities of Akita Prefecture
Semboku, Akita